The following outline is provided as an overview of and topical guide to rocketry:

Rocketry – The design and construction of rockets and rocket engines, and the vehicles, missiles, and other items propelled by them.

Essence of rocketry 
 Aerospace engineering
 High tech
 Rocket
 Rocket engine
 Spaceport

History of rocketry 
 List of Ariane launches
 List of Atlas launches
 List of Black Brant launches
 List of Falcon 9 and Falcon Heavy launches
 List of Long March launches
 List of Proton launches
 List of R-7 launches
 List of Scout launches
 List of Space Launch System launches
 List of Thor and Delta launches
 List of Titan launches
 List of Zenit launches
 Vergeltungswaffe
 V-1 flying bomb
 V-2 rocket
 List of V-2 test launches
 List of V-2 launches in the United States

Rocket components 
 Adapter (rocketry)
 Booster (rocketry)
 Liquid rocket booster
 Solid rocket booster
 Fin
 Grid fin
 Payload fairing
 Rocket engine
 Apogee kick motor
 Dual-thrust
 Rocket turbine engine
 Thrust curve

Rocket manufacturers 
 Boeing
 Indian Space Research Organisation
 Lockheed Martin
 Northrop Grumman
 Rocket Lab
 Roscosmos
 SpaceX

Rockets by type 
 Propellant
 Hybrid-propellant rocket
 Liquid-propellant rocket
 Solid-propellant rocket
 Reusability
 Expendable launch system
 Reusable launch system
 Role
 Launch escape system
 Launch vehicle
 Missile
 Model rocket
 Rocket (weapon)
 Sounding rocket

Spaceports 
 Baikonur Cosmodrome
 Gagarin's Start
 Site 31
 Site 41
 Site 45
 Site 81
 Site 90
 Site 109
 Site 110
 Site 200
 Site 250
 Cape Canaveral Air Force Station
 Space Launch Complex 37
 Space Launch Complex 40
 Space Launch Complex 41
 Kennedy Space Center
 Launch Complex 39
 Launch Complex 39A
 Launch Complex 39B
 Launch Complex 48
 Pacific Spaceport Complex – Alaska
 Rocket Lab Launch Complex 1
 Satish Dhawan Space Centre
 First Launch Pad
 Second Launch Pad
 SLV Launch Pad
 Third Launch Pad
 Vandenberg Air Force Base
 Space Launch Complex 1
 Space Launch Complex 2
 Space Launch Complex 3
 Space Launch Complex 4
 Space Launch Complex 5
 Space Launch Complex 6
 Space Launch Complex 8
 Space Launch Complex 10

See also 
 Outline of aerospace
 Outline of space exploration

Outlines of society
Wikipedia outlines
Technology-related lists
Outline
Outlines of technology and applied science